Newton Whitfield McConnell (May 22, 1832 – December 22, 1915) was chief justice of the Territorial Montana Supreme Court, appointed by President Grover Cleveland, serving from 1887 to 1889.

Born in Marshall County, Tennessee, McConnell attended Allegheny College in Pennsylvania from 1853 to 1855. He taught for a short time and then began reading the law in preparation for the Bar. McConnell served in the Tennessee Cavalry during the American Civil War, retiring as a captain. He was admitted to the Tennessee Bar in 1867 after the war and served in the Tennessee Senate and as a Tennessee circuit judge for eleven years. In 1887, President Grover Cleveland appointed him Chief Justice of the Montana Territorial Supreme court, in which position he remained until 1889.

He married Nancy Elizabeth McCall on February 26, 1856 and they had three children. In 1903, McConnell retired to Seattle, Washington. He died in Topeka, Kansas, at the age of 83, but was buried in Helena, Montana.

References

1832 births
1915 deaths
People from Marshall County, Tennessee
Allegheny College alumni
U.S. state supreme court judges admitted to the practice of law by reading law
Confederate States Army officers
Tennessee state senators
Justices of the Montana Supreme Court
United States Article I federal judges appointed by Grover Cleveland